Empire Dabchick was a  Design 1019 cargo ship that was built in 1919 as Kisnop by Atlantic Corporation, Portsmouth, New Hampshire, United States for the United States Shipping Board (USSB). She was transferred to the United States Maritime Commission (USMC) in 1937. In 1940 she was transferred to the Ministry of War Transport (MoWT) and renamed Empire Dabchick.

Description
The ship was built in 1919 by Atlantic Corporation, Portsmouth, New Hampshire. She was yard number 1.

The engine was built by Atlantic Corporation, Taunton, Massachusetts.

History
Kisnop was launched in 1919, and completed in August of that year. She was built for the USSB and was transferred to the USMC in 1937. Her port of registry was Portsmouth, New Hampshire. On transfer to the USMC, Kisnop was laid up in reserve.

On 14 November 1940, Kisnop was given to the United Kingdom, passing to the MoWT. She was renamed Empire Dabchick and placed under the management of Sir W Reardon Smith & Sons. The United Kingdom Official Number 168184 and Code Letters GNSN were allocated. Her port of registry was London. Later that year, management was transferred to J Morrison & Son, Newcastle upon Tyne. Kisnop  was due to join Convoy HX 116, but did not sail in that convoy, nor in the next convoy, HX 117. Kisnop sailed in Convoy SC 28, which departed from Halifax, Nova Scotia, Canada on 9 April 1941 and arrived at Liverpool, Lancashire, United Kingdom on 28 April. Kisnop was carrying a cargo consisting general and special cargo, iron, steel and trucks. She was bound for Middlesbrough, Yorkshire. She straggled behind the convoy on 19 April and did not rejoin, putting into an Icelandic port.

Kisnop had been renamed Empire Dabchick by 16 June 1941, when she arrived at the Tyne. On 18 June, she joined Convoy FN 494, which departed from Southend on Sea, Essex that day and arrived at Methil, Fife two days later. On 22 June, she joined Convoy EC 48, which had departed from Southend on 20 June and arrived at the Clyde on 25 June. Empire Dabchick then sailed to Philadelphia, Pennsylvania, arriving on 16 August. On 13 September, she departed Philadelphia for Sydney, Cape Breton, Canada, arriving on 19 September. She then joined Convoy SC 47, which departed on 29 September and arrived at Liverpool on 20 October. Empire Dabchick was carrying general cargo.

She arrived at Halifax on 9 December. On 23 December, she sailed for New York, United States, where she arrived on 26 December. On 18 January, she departed New York for Halifax, arriving on 21 January. She then joined Convoy SC 66, which departed on 23 January and arrived at Liverpool on 9 February. Empire Dabchick was carrying general cargo. She left the convoy at Belfast Lough on 8 February. On 11 February, she joined Convoy BB 136, which arrived at Milford Haven, Pembrokeshire on 13 February. Her destination was Cardiff, Glamorgan, where she arrived that day.

Empire Dabchick departed Cardiff on 1 March for Milford Haven, from where she joined Convoy ON 72, which departed from Liverpool on 3 March and arrived at Halifax on 19 March. She was carrying a cargo of coal. She then joined Convoy XB4, which departed Halifax on 26 March and arrived at Boston, Massachusetts, United States on 29 March. She left the convoy at the Cape Cod Canal on 28 March and sailed to New York, arriving on 1 April. Empire Dabchick then made a voyage to Baltimore, Maryland and back before she departed from New York on 17 April for Halifax, arriving on 20 April. She then joined Convoy SC 81, which departed on 23 April and arrived at Liverpool on 9 May. She was carrying a cargo of steel.

Empire Dabchick was a member of Convoy ON 98, which departed from Liverpool on 26 May and arrived at Halifax on 11 June. Two days later, she departed Halifax for Pubnico, Nova Scotia, arriving the next day. On 16 July, she departed Pubnico for Halifax and New York, where she arrived on 27 July. Empire Dabchick departed from New York on 22 August for Cape Cod Bay, Massachusetts, from where she joined Convoy BX 35, which had departed Boston on 26 August and arrived at Halifax on 29 August. She then joined Convoy SC 98, which departed that day and arrived at Liverpool on 13 September. She was carrying general cargo.

Empire Dabchick was a member of Convoy ON 136, which departed from Liverpool on 3 October and arrived at New York on 26 October. She was carrying the convoy's Vice-Commodore, but she returned to the Clyde, arriving on 6 October. She left the Clyde on 11 October, joining Convoy ON 138, which had departed from Liverpool on 11 October and arrived at New York on 3 November. She again returned to the Clyde, arriving on 16 October. She departed the Clyde on what was to be her final voyage on 15 November, joining Convoy ON 146, which had departed from Liverpool that day and arrived at New York on 8 December. Empire Dabchick straggled behind the convoy. Those lost on Empire Dabchick are commemorated at the Tower Hill Memorial, London.

References

External links
Photo of the ship

1919 ships
Ships built in New Hampshire
Steamships of the United States
Merchant ships of the United States
World War II merchant ships of the United States
Empire ships
Ministry of War Transport ships
Steamships of the United Kingdom
Merchant ships of the United Kingdom
Ships sunk by German submarines in World War II
Maritime incidents in December 1942
World War II shipwrecks in the Atlantic Ocean
Ships lost with all hands